Venezuelan Association of North American Schools (VANAS) is an international high schools athletics conference in Venezuela.

Participating teams 
 CIC (Colegio Internacional de Caracas)
 CIC (Colegio Internacional de Carabobo)
 CIPLC (Colegio Internacional de Puerto La Cruz)
 ECA (Escuela Campo Alegre)
 EBV (Escuela Bella Vista)
 ISM  (International School of Monagas)
 CELM (Centro Educativo Las Morochas)

Sports Played 
 Baseball
 Volleyball
 Basketball
 Soccer
 Tennis
 Softball

High school sports conferences and leagues in the United States